Tenali is a city in Guntur district, Andhra Pradesh, India.

Tenali may also refer to:

Places 
Tenali revenue division, a revenue division in the Guntur district, Andhra Pradesh, India
Tenali mandal, a mandal in Guntur district, Andhra Pradesh, India
Tenali (Assembly constituency), Assembly constituency in Andhra Pradesh Legislative Assembly for Tenali city

Other
Tenali Ramakrishna, a Telugu poet and one of the eight poets at the court of Krishnadevaraya, the Vijayanagara emperor
Tenali Ramakrishna (film), a 1956 Telugu film
Tenali Raman (film), a 1956 Tamil film
Tenaliraman (film), a 2014 Tamil film
Tenali Rama (TV series), a 2017 TV Series broadcast on Star Bharat
The Adventures of Tenali Raman, an animated TV series on Cartoon Network (2003)

See also
Thenali, a 2000 Tamil film